Dzierżążno railway station is a railway station in the village of Dzierżążno, in the Pomeranian Voivodeship, Poland. The original railway through Dzierżążno opened in 1886. The station was closed in 1994, when train services on the line between Pruszcz Gdański and Kartuzy ceased. Modernisation of the line and the rebuilding of the stations took place between May and September 2015. The station re-opened on 1 October 2015 and is located on the Pruszcz Gdański–Łeba railway. The train services are operated by SKM Tricity as part of the Pomorska Kolej Metropolitalna (PKM).

Train services
The station is served by the following services:

Pomorska Kolej Metropolitalna services (R) Kartuzy — Gdańsk Port Lotniczy (Airport) — Gdańsk Główny

References 

 This article is based upon a translation of the Polish language version as of November 2016.

Railway stations in Poland opened in 2015
Railway stations in Pomeranian Voivodeship
Kartuzy County